Sharpe's Battle is a 1995 British television drama, the seventh of a series screened on the ITV network that follows the career of Richard Sharpe, a fictional British soldier during the Napoleonic Wars. It is somewhat based on the 1995 novel of the same name by Bernard Cornwell, though the film is set in 1813 on the Spanish-French border, rather than in 1811 on the border with Portugal.

Plot

While on patrol, Sharpe (Sean Bean) and his men rout some French soldiers who have raped and murdered the inhabitants of a Spanish village. Two are captured alive. Their commander, Brigadier General Loup (Oliver Cotton), attempts to bargain with Sharpe for the lives of his men, but Sharpe has them shot in front of him. Loup vows revenge as he departs.

Meanwhile, Wellington (Hugh Fraser) receives unwanted reinforcements from the King of Spain. His Most Catholic Majesty sends his personal bodyguard, the Real Compania Irlandesa (Royal Irish Company), composed of poorly trained men of Irish descent under the command of the inexperienced Lord Kiely (Jason Durr). Wellington does not trust them, not least because of reports in American newspapers that the British are committing atrocities against the Irish people. So he orders the unreliable men to garrison a fort near the French lines, where it will be easy for them to desert if they want to. He assigns Sharpe to train them and puts him under the command of former Wagonmaster-General Colonel Runciman (Ian McNeice).

Kiely's wife, Lady Kiely (Allie Byrne), and his mistress, guerrilla leader Doña Juanita (Siri Neal), both show up in camp. In the meantime, Sharpe has enough time to train the men and strengthen the fort's defences, so that when Loup finally attacks, he is repulsed. Afterwards, Sharpe proposes a quick surprise assault on Loup's headquarters, which is approved by Kiely, Runciman and Juanita.

When Kiely learns that his wife is pregnant, he sends her away, out of harm's way, but she is captured. Juanita reveals herself to be a French agent by giving Kiely a secret ultimatum from Loup. He is to let Sharpe and his men commit themselves to the attack, then abandon them in exchange for Lady Kiely's life.

It almost goes according to plan. Sharpe's men are trapped, though he himself manages to reach Kiely. When Kiely refuses to act, Sharpe fights him, only to be shot in the arm by Juanita. At that point, Kiely finally rebels. He kills Juanita and shows that she had distributed fake newspapers to undermine the Irishmen's loyalty. Together, he and Sharpe lead the attack against the French. Meanwhile, Harper, in temporary command of Sharpe's company, tricks the French by pretending to be dead. The British win the fight - although Harper is devastated by the death of his youngest rifleman, Perkins (Lyndon Davies), killed by a rebel in the Irish Company, who Harper, hungry for revenge, ultimately kills. As the battle draws to a close, Kiely is killed by Loup when he tries to free his pregnant wife. Loup is slain in turn by Sharpe.

Now a widow, Lady Kiely leaves the country and the surviving Chosen Men bury Perkins next to his lover Miranda, who Juanita had previously murdered. The riflemen salute Perkins and solemnly leave the grave. Sharpe takes one last look at Perkins' final resting place before moving on.

Cast
 Sean Bean – Major Richard Sharpe
 Daragh O'Malley – Sergeant Patrick Harper
 Hugh Fraser – Lord Wellington
 Hugh Ross – Mungo Munro
 John Tams – Rifleman Daniel Hagman
 Jason Salkey – Rifleman Harris
 Lyndon Davies – Rifleman Ben Perkins
 Jason Durr – Lord Kiely
 Allie Byrne – Lady Kiely
 Ian McNeice – Runciman
 Oliver Cotton – Loup
 Siri Neal – Juanita
 Liam Carney – O'Rourke
 Phelim Drew – Donaju
 Diana Perez – Ramona
 Robert Hands – Jenkins
 Maria Petrucci – Miranda

Production notes
The programme was filmed in Ukraine.

Soundtrack
 "Johnny Has Gone for a Soldier"

External links
 
 Sharpe's Battle at SharpeFilm.com

1995 British television episodes
1990s historical films
1990s war films
Films based on British novels
Films based on historical novels
Films based on military novels
Napoleonic Wars films
Battle
War television films
Cultural depictions of Arthur Wellesley, 1st Duke of Wellington
Fiction set in 1813
Films directed by Tom Clegg (director)